The Dream is a 1985 Dutch drama film directed by Pieter Verhoeff. The film was selected as the Dutch entry for the Best Foreign Language Film at the 58th Academy Awards, but was not accepted as a nominee.

Cast
 Peter Tuinman as Wiebren Hogerhuis
 Huub Stapel as Inspecteur van politie
 Joke Tjalsma as Ymkje Jansma
 Freark Smink as Pieter Jelsma
 Hans Veerman as Commissaris van politie
 Adrian Brine as Officier van justitie
 Jan Arendsz as Allard Dijkstra

See also
 List of submissions to the 58th Academy Awards for Best Foreign Language Film
 List of Dutch submissions for the Academy Award for Best Foreign Language Film

References

External links
 

1985 films
1985 drama films
Dutch drama films
1980s Dutch-language films
Films directed by Pieter Verhoeff
Films shot in the Netherlands
Golan-Globus films